Gabrielle Eileen Suzanne Sullivan (born 28 July 1998) is a New Zealand cricketer who currently plays for Canterbury. In February 2021, Sullivan earned her maiden call-up to the New Zealand women's cricket team, for their Women's One Day International (WODI) matches against England. She replaced Lea Tahuhu, who had been ruled out of the side due to a hamstring injury. In March 2021, Sullivan was added to New Zealand's Women's Twenty20 International (WT20I), also for the matches against England, as injury cover for Hannah Rowe.

References

External links
 
 

1998 births
Living people
Cricketers from Christchurch
New Zealand women cricketers
Canterbury Magicians cricketers
Dorset women cricketers